Patrick Curtin (17 March 1989 – 29 December 2015) was an Irish Gaelic footballer who played as a left corner-forward for the Kerry senior football team.

Born in Moyvane, County Kerry, Curtin first played competitive Gaelic football in his youth. At club level he played with Moyvane. Curtin arrived on the inter-county scene when he first linked up with the Kerry minor team before later joining the under-21 and junior sides. He made his senior debut during the 2012 league. He would go on to play for Kerry for two seasons. He made a total of six championship appearances for Kerry. These included substitute appearances in two All-Ireland quarter-finals: in the 2012 loss to eventual champions Donegal, as well as the 2013 defeat of Cavan. His retirement came during the conclusion of the 2013 championship.

References

External links
 RTÉ
 Times
 Independent
 Mirror
 JOE Her

1989 births
2015 deaths
Kerry inter-county Gaelic footballers
Moyvane Gaelic footballers